Benedict I may refer to:
 Benedict I of Jerusalem (1892–1980), Patriarch of Jerusalem of the Greek Orthodox Church
 Benedict I, Archbishop of Esztergom (died 1055)
 Pope Benedict I (died 579), Pope of the Catholic Church